In category theory, a branch of mathematics, a limit or a colimit of presheaves on a category C is a limit or colimit in the functor category .

The category  admits small limits and small colimits. Explicitly, if  is a functor from a small category I and U is an object in C, then  is computed pointwise:

The same is true for small limits. Concretely this means that, for example, a fiber product exists and is computed pointwise.

 

(in particular the colimit on the right exists in D.)

The density theorem states that every presheaf is a colimit of representable presheaves.

Notes

References 

Category theory
Sheaf theory